Darreh Shur (also Romanized as Darreh Shūr, Dareh Shoor, and Darreh-ye Shūr) is a village in Izadkhvast-e Gharbi Rural District, Izadkhvast District, Zarrin Dasht County, Fars Province, Iran. At the 2006 census, its population was 1,761, in 395 families.

References 

Populated places in Zarrin Dasht County